The E531 is a B-class road of the trans-European International E-road network in Germany, connecting the cities of Offenburg and Donaueschingen.

Route and E-road junctions 
  (via shared signage  B33a then  B33)
 Offenburg:  E35
 Villingen-Schwenningen
 Bad Dürrheim
 Donaueschingen

External links 
 UN Economic Commission for Europe: Overall Map of E-road Network (2007)
 International E-road network

531